Pristimantis melanogaster is a species of frog in the family Strabomantidae. It is endemic to northern Peru where it is only known from vicinity of the type locality in the Bagua Province, Amazonas Region.
Its natural habitats are páramo and elfin forest within very humid montane forest at elevations of  asl. It is known from only three locations in a region subject to destruction of habitat through agriculture, livestock grazing and wood extraction.

References

melanogaster
Endemic fauna of Peru
Amphibians of Peru
Páramo fauna
Amphibians described in 1999
Taxonomy articles created by Polbot